The 2005–06 season was the 114th season in Liverpool Football Clubs existence, and their 44th consecutive year in the top-flight, and covers the period from 1 June 2005 to 30 May 2006. Liverpool finished the season in third position, nine points behind champions Chelsea. They won the FA Cup for the seventh time by beating West Ham United in the final 3–1 on penalties after a 3–3 draw.

Players

First team squad

Left club during season

Reserve squad

Statistics

Appearances and goals

|-
! colspan=14 style=background:#dcdcdc; text-align:center| Goalkeepers

|-
! colspan=14 style=background:#dcdcdc; text-align:center| Defenders

|-
! colspan=14 style=background:#dcdcdc; text-align:center| Midfielders

|-
! colspan=14 style=background:#dcdcdc; text-align:center| Forwards

|-
! colspan=14 style=background:#dcdcdc; text-align:center| Players transferred out during the season

Goalscorers

Transfers

In

Out

All games

Pre-season

Premier League

Matches

League table

Results summary

Results by round

UEFA Champions League

Qualifying rounds

First qualifying roundSecond qualifying roundThird qualifying round

Group stage

Round of 16

FA Cup

League Cup

UEFA Super Cup

FIFA Club World Cup

Semi-finals

Final

See also
2005–06 in English football
2006 FA Cup Final

References

Notes

External links
2005–06 Season at LFC History
2005–06 Season at Official Liverpool Website

Liverpool F.C. seasons
Liverpool